The large moth family Gelechiidae contains the following genera:

Galtica
Gambrostola
Gelechia
Geniadophora
Gibbosa
Gladiovalva
Glauce
Glycerophthora
Gnorimoschema
Gobipalpa
Gonaepa
Grandipalpa

References

 Natural History Museum Lepidoptera genus database

Gelechiidae
Gelechiid